The 1929 Central State Bearcats football team represented Central State Teachers College, later renamed Central Michigan University, in the Michigan Collegiate Conference (MCC) during the 1929 college football season. The team compiled a 2–3–2 record (0–3 against MCC opponents) and were outscored by opponents by a combined total of 80 to 71. The team lost to its in-state rivals Michigan State Normal (0–24), Western State Teachers (6–25) and Detroit City College (0–6), and played Northern State Teachers to a 6–6 tie.

Butch Nowack was hired as the team's head coach in May 1929.  Nowack was an All-American tackle at the University of Illinois under Robert Zuppke, a member of the 1927 Illinois Fighting Illini football team that won the national championship, and captain of the 1928 team that won the Big Ten Conference championship.

Schedule

References

Central State
Central Michigan Chippewas football seasons
Central State Bearcats football